Ipso facto is a Latinism used in law, philosophy and science.

Ipso Facto may refer to:

Music groups
 Ipso Facto (English band) (2007–2009)
 Viva Machine (formerly Ipsofacto), a Welsh rock band (2003–2009)

Musical works
 Ipso Facto (album), a 1992 album by Canadian Rik Emmett
 Ipso Facto, a 1992 album by Frenchman Bruno Grimaldi
 "Ipso Facto", the John Hall Band's 1983 song

Literature
Iegor Gran#Bibliography